Abacetus ennedianus is a species of ground beetle in the subfamily Pterostichinae. It was described by Mateu in 1966.

References

ennedianus
Beetles described in 1966